Pshish is a river in Krasnodar Krai and the Republic of Adygea of Russia. It is a left tributary of the Kuban.

References

Rivers of Krasnodar Krai
Rivers of Adygea